Jindřich Krištof Hataš (1756–1808) was a German composer and violinist of Czech origin.

The son of Dismas Hataš and Anna Franziska Benda, Jindřich Krištof was born in Gotha. He was taught to play the violin by his father. It has been suggested that a reference to Hattasch junior as the music director of Johann Joseph von Brunian's theatre group in Brno refers to Jindřich Krištof Hataš, but this has not been verified. In 1778 he was appointed as first violinist in the theatre orchestra of Friedrich Ludwig Schröder in Hamburg. He remained in Hamburg for the rest of his life. Among his known works are three singspiele Der Barbier von Bagdad (lost), Der ehrliche Schweizer (lost) and Helva und Zelinde, from which several numbers were published in Hamburg in 1796.

Further reading 
 Alfred Baumgartner: Propyläen Welt der Musik. Band 2: Cools – Hauer. Propyläen-Verlag, Berlin 1989, S. 481.

References

External links 
 http://www.ceskyhudebnislovnik.cz/slovnik/index.php?option=com_mdictionary&action=record_detail&id=6899

1739 births
Czech classical composers
1808 deaths
Czech male classical composers
German male classical composers
Czech classical violinists
German classical violinists
Male classical violinists
18th-century German composers
18th-century German male musicians
18th-century violinists
People from Gotha (town)
German opera composers
Male opera composers
Czech opera composers